David Lewis Marshall (January 14, 1943 – June 6, 2019) was an American Major League Baseball outfielder with the San Francisco Giants, New York Mets and San Diego Padres.

Early years
At the end of his first season of professional baseball, he suffering a torn rotator cuff in his right shoulder playing winter ball with the San Jose Bees.

He batted .252 with 23 home runs and 166 runs batted in over three seasons in the Angels' farm system when he was dealt to the San Francisco Giants for fellow minor leaguer Héctor Torres at the start of the  season.

San Francisco Giants
Marshall appeared in one game as a pinch runner in  before winning a job as a back up corner outfielder out of Spring training . After a few pinch hitting appearances, Marshall went 3-for-5 with two runs scored and an RBI in his first start to lead the Giants to a 7-0 victory over the Atlanta Braves.

Marshall batted .264 with just one home run (off the St. Louis Cardinals' Ray Washburn) and sixteen RBIs his rookie season. He and teammate Bobby Bonds were named to the Topps All-Star Rookie Team's outfield. Torres, now with the Houston Astros, was its shortstop.

In , he shifted into a lefty/righty platoon with Jim Ray Hart and Ken Henderson in left field. Marshall was dealt along with Ray Sadecki from the Giants to the New York Mets for Bob Heise and Jim Gosger on December 12, 1969.

New York Mets
In his first at bat against his former franchise, Marshall hit a grand slam off Giants ace Gaylord Perry on his way to a career high six home runs his first season as a Met.

He hit a second career grand slam off the Astros' George Culver the following season. For his career, Marshall batted .333 with the two home runs and 29 RBIs with the bases loaded.

San Diego Padres
Following the  season, the Mets dealt Marshall to the San Diego Padres for pitcher Al Severinsen. He batted .286 with no home runs and four RBIs in very limited playing time with the Padres. He finished out the  season with the triple A Hawaii Islanders, then was sold to the Chicago White Sox. He retired shortly afterwards, never appearing in a game at any level with the Chisox.

Career statistics

After retiring, Marshall owned three very successful taverns in Manhattan– Marshall’s, Oasis and Rascal’s.

Marshall died June 6, 2019, less than 48 hours after his wife died.

References

External links
. or The Ultimate Mets Database
Pura Pelota

1943 births
2019 deaths
Arizona Instructional League Angels players
Arizona Instructional League Giants players
Baseball players from Long Beach, California
Hawaii Islanders players
Major League Baseball outfielders
New York Mets players
People from Artesia, California
Phoenix Giants players
Quad Cities Angels players
San Diego Padres players
San Francisco Giants players
San Jose Bees players
Tigres de Aragua players
Tri-City Atoms players
Waterbury Giants players
Tri-City Angels players